John M. Imel (August 4, 1932 – December 25, 2014) was an American attorney who served as the United States Attorney for the Northern District of Oklahoma from 1961 to 1967.

He died in Tulsa, Oklahoma at age 82.

References

1932 births
2014 deaths
United States Attorneys for the Northern District of Oklahoma
Oklahoma Democrats